The women's duet synchronized swimming event at the 2010 Commonwealth Games was held from 6 to 7 October, at the SPM Swimming Pool Complex.
7 duets competed, each consisting of two swimmers. There were two rounds of competition. The preliminary round consisted of a technical routine and a free routine.

Results

References

Aquatics at the 2010 Commonwealth Games
Synchronised swimming at the 2010 Commonwealth Games
Commonwealth Games
2010 in women's sport